Malama may refer to:

People
Given name
Malama Katulwende, Zambian author, poet and thinker
Malama Meleisea, Samoan historian
Malama Solomon (born 1951), American politician and member of the Hawaii Senate 

Surname
Donashano Malama (born 1991), Zambian footballer
Happy Malama (born 1947), Zambian footballer / goalkeeper

Other uses
SS Malama, a United States cargo ship that saw service in World War II
Uroplatus malama a species of lizard

See also
Malamas, a surname